"Say Yes" is a Japanese single by Chage and Aska, released by Pony Canyon on July 24, 1991. The song was used as a theme of the Japanese television drama 101 kaime no Propose. It was regarded as a wedding song.

On the Japanese Oricon weekly single charts, "Say Yes" spent 13 consecutive weeks at the number-one position. The single became the best-selling song for the duo. It sold over 2.82 million copies and is the seventh best-selling single in Oricon charts history.

Cover versions
In 1992, Hong Kong singer Raymond Choi covered this song in Cantonese. Debbie Gibson recorded an English-language cover of the song in her 2010 Japan-only release Ms. Vocalist.

See also
List of best-selling singles in Japan

References

1991 singles
Chage and Aska songs
Oricon Weekly number-one singles
Japanese television drama theme songs
1991 songs
Pony Canyon singles